John A. Page (June 17, 1814 – August 23, 1891) was a Vermont banker and political figure who served as Vermont State Treasurer.

Early life
John Alfred Page was born in Haverhill, New Hampshire on June 17, 1814.  He was the son of John Page and Hannah Merrill. John Page served in the United States Senate and as Governor of New Hampshire.

The younger Page was educated in Haverhill and graduated from Haverhill Academy.  He trained to be a merchant, clerking at dry goods stores in Portland, Maine and Haverhill. The Haverhill store in which he worked closed during the Panic of 1837, and Page began a career in banking as Cashier of the Grafton Bank.

In 1848 Page moved to Danville, Vermont to accept the position of Cashier at the Caledonia Bank.  A Democrat in politics, he served in the Vermont House of Representatives from 1848 to 1849.

Page became associated with Erastus Fairbanks in 1849 as Financial Agent for the Passumpsic and Connecticut Rivers Railroad, and relocated to Newbury.

Later career
Later in 1849 Page was appointed Cashier of the Vermont Bank and moved to Montpelier, where he lived for the rest of his life.  In 1852 he ran for Vermont State Treasurer, and was defeated by George Howes.

From 1853 to 1854 Page served as Vermont State Treasurer, succeeding George Howes.  He finished second in the balloting, and was chosen by the Vermont General Assembly after a multi-candidate election in which no candidate received the majority required by the Vermont Constitution.  In 1854 he was defeated for another term by Henry M. Bates.  He also lost an 1855 rematch to Bates.

The First National Bank of Vermont was organized in 1865, and Page was elected a member of the board of directors and appointed as the bank’s President.

By now a Republican, in 1866 Page was again elected State Treasurer, succeeding John B. Page. He served until 1882, and was succeeded by William H. Dubois.

Death
Page retired from most of his business interests in 1882, but continued to serve as President of the First National Bank until January, 1891.  He died in Montpelier on August 23, 1891.  Page was buried at Green Mount Cemetery in Montpelier.

Family
John A. Page was married to Martha Ward of Haverhill. They had one son, John W. Page (1847-1930), who worked with his father in Montpelier and later moved to Nebraska to raise cattle and Louisiana to operate a rice plantation.

References

External links

1814 births
1891 deaths
People from Haverhill, New Hampshire
People from Montpelier, Vermont
Members of the Vermont House of Representatives
State treasurers of Vermont
American bankers
19th-century American businesspeople
Vermont Democrats
Vermont Republicans
19th-century American politicians
Burials at Green Mount Cemetery (Montpelier, Vermont)